Clifton Mayne (1933–2014) was an American tennis player. He was from California. He worked in the direct mail industry and served on the Executive board of the Direct Marketing Association. He made his debut at U.S. Championships in 1952 and lost in round three to Charles Masterson. In 1953, Mayne led two sets to love against Budge Patty in round two but lost in five sets. In 1955 he lost in round three to Vic Seixas and in 1956 lost in round two to Robert Bedard. In 1957 Mayne lost in round one on his Wimbledon debut to Seixas. At the 1957 U.S. Championships Mayne beat Neale Fraser before losing to Sven Davidson in the quarterfinals. At Wimbledon 1960 he lost in round one to Boro Jovanović.<ref name="barrett2001">

References

1933 births
2014 deaths
American male tennis players
Tennis people from California
California Golden Bears men's tennis players